This is a list of LGBT rights organizations around the world. For social and support groups or organizations affiliated with mainstream religious organizations, please see List of LGBT-related organizations and conferences. For organizations affiliated with political parties, please see List of LGBT organizations that affiliate with political parties.

International 
 All Out
 International Lesbian, Gay, Bisexual, Trans and Intersex Association (ILGA)
 IGLYO
 International Lesbian, Gay, Bisexual, Transgender & Intersex Law Association (ILGLaw)
 International Lesbian Information Service (defunct)
 Iranian Railroad for Queer Refugees
 GATE
 Global Respect In Education (GRIN)
 Gay and Lesbian International Sport Association (GLISA)
 Human Dignity Trust
 The Kaleidoscope Trust
 Organization Intersex International (OII)
 OutRight Action International (formerly IGLHRC)
 Trans March

Africa

Algeria 
 Tranz Homos DZ

Kenya 
 Gay and Lesbian Coalition of Kenya

Nigeria 
 Bisi Alimi Foundation

South Africa 
 Intersex South Africa

Tunisia 
 Shams

Uganda 
 Sexual Minorities Uganda (SMUG)

Zimbabwe 
 Gays and Lesbians of Zimbabwe (GALZ)

Asia 
 Asian Lesbian Network

China 
 Oii-Chinese
 DiversityUNNC - Ningbo

Bangladesh 
 Boys of Bangladesh

India 
 Humsafar Trust
 Naz Foundation (India) Trust
 Nazariya
 Udaan Trust
 Srishti Madurai
 Orinam
 Queerala
 Sangama (human rights group)
 Sappho for Equality

Lebanon 
 Helem
 Meem

Sri Lanka 
 Equal Ground

Taiwan 
 Taiwan Alliance to Promote Civil Partnership Rights (TAPCPR)
 Gender/Sexuality Rights Association Taiwan (GSRAT)
 Taiwan Tongzhi Hotline Association (TTHA)

Iran 
 Iranian Queer Organization (based in Canada)
 Iranian Railroad for Queer Refugees (based in Canada)

Israel 
 Israeli Gay, Lesbian, Bisexual and Transgender Association
 Israel Gay Youth (IGY)
 Hoshen - Education and Change
 Jerusalem Open House
 Tehila

Nepal 
 Blue Diamond Society

Singapore 
 Pink Dot SG
 Young Out Here

South Korea 
 Solidarity for LGBT Human Rights of Korea

Australia and Oceania

Australia 
 Androgen Insensitivity Syndrome Support Group Australia (AISSGA)
 Australian Lesbian and Gay Archives (ALGA)
 Australian Marriage Equality (AME)
 Coalition of Activist Lesbians Australia (COAL)
 Community Action Against Homophobia (CAAH)
 Kaleidoscope Australia Human Rights Foundation (KAHRF)
 National LGBTI Health Alliance
 Organisation Intersex International Australia (OII Australia)
 Transgender Victoria (TGV)
 Victorian Pride Lobby
 Zoe Belle Gender Centre (ZBGC)

New Zealand 
 Intersex Trust Aotearoa New Zealand

Europe 
 European Parliament Intergroup on LGBT Rights
 ILGA-Europe
 LGBT Network
 OII Europe
 Transgender Europe (TGeu)

Armenia 
 Pink Armenia
 Right Side NGO

Austria 
 International Human Rights Tribunal

Belarus 
 LGBT Human Rights Project "GayBelarus"

Bosnia and Herzegovina 
 Sarajevo Open Centre

Bulgaria 
 BGO Gemini

Croatia 
 Zagreb Pride
 Proces

Cyprus 
 Cypriot Gay Liberation Movement

Denmark 
 LGBT Danmark
 Copenhagen Pride

Estonia 
 Geikristlaste Kogu

Faroe Islands 
 Friðarbogin

Finland 
 Pink Rose
 Seta - LGBTI Rights in Finland

France 
 Act Up
 Arcadie
 Association des Gays et Lesbiens Arméniens de France
 GayLib
 Homosexualités et Socialisme
 Inter-LGBT
 SOS Homophobie
 Beit Haverim

Georgia
 Identoba

Germany 
 Lesbian and Gay Federation in Germany (LSVD)

Greenland 
 LGBT Qaamaneq

Hungary 
 Háttér Society
 Hungarian LGBT Alliance
 Labrisz Lesbian Association

Iceland 
 Samtökin '78
 Trans Ísland

Ireland 
 Campaign for Homosexual Law Reform
 LGBT Ireland
 Gay Doctors Ireland
 National LGBT Federation
 Union of Students in Ireland

Italy 
 Arcigay
 Circle of Homosexual Culture Mario Mieli

Lithuania 
 Lithuanian Gay League

Montenegro 
 Queer Montenegro

The Netherlands 
 COC Nederland

Norway 
 Norwegian National Association for Lesbian and Gay Liberation (LLH)

Poland 
 Campaign Against Homophobia (KPH)
 Lambda Warszawa
 Stop Bzdurom

Romania 
 Accept
 Be An Angel

Russia 
 Children-404: a Russian public internet project which supports homosexual, bisexual and transgender teenagers in Russia. 404 alludes to the internet error message "Error 404 - Page not found" and refers to the ignoring of the existence of LGBT teenagers by Russian society and establishment.
 LGBT Human Rights Project Gayrussia.ru
 Russian LGBT network

Serbia 
 Gay Lesbian Info Centre

Spain 
 Federación Estatal de Lesbianas, Gays, Transexuales y Bisexuales

Sweden 
 HomO, The Ombudsman against Discrimination on Grounds of Sexual Orientation (government office)
 Swedish Federation for Lesbian, Gay, Bisexual and Transgender Rights (RFSL)

Turkey 
 KAOS GL
 Lambdaistanbul
 LEGATO, LGBT group of university students and academics with nationwide organization

United Kingdom 
 Black Gay Men's Advisory Group
 Cara-Friend (Northern Ireland)
 Campaign for Homosexual Equality
 Educational Action Challenging Homophobia
 Equality Network (Scotland)
 Intersex UK
 The Kaleidoscope Trust
 LGBT Foundation (formerly Lesbian and Gay Foundation)
 LGBT Humanists UK
 LGBT Network (Scotland)
 LGBT Youth Scotland
 Mermaids Gender
 Outright Scotland (formerly the Scottish Minorities Group)
 Peter Tatchell Foundation
 Racing Pride
 Stonewall

North America 
 United Caribbean Trans Network

Bahamas 
 Rainbow Alliance of The Bahamas

Belize 

 United Belize Advocacy Movement

Canada

National 
 Canadian Centre for Diversity and Inclusion
 Community One Foundation
 Egale Canada, formerly Equality for Gays and Lesbians Everywhere
 Iranian Railroad for Queer Refugees
 Iranian Queer Organization
 Lambda Foundation
 PFLAG Canada
 ProudPolitics
 Rainbow Railroad

British Columbia 
Qmunity (Vancouver, British Columbia)

Ontario 
 Supporting Our Youth

Jamaica 
 Jamaica Forum for Lesbians, All-sexuals, and Gays (JFLAG)

United States

South America

Chile 
 Movimiento de Integración y Liberación Homosexual (MOVILH)

Colombia 
 Colombia Diversa

Ecuador 
 Fundación Ecuatoriana Equidad

Guyana 
 Society Against Sexual Orientation Discrimination (SASOD)

See also 
 Gay community
 LGBT rights by country or territory
 List of intersex organizations
 List of transgender-rights organizations

References 

Lists of organizations
 
Rights
Human rights-related lists